Sky at Night may refer to:

 the night sky
 Sky at Night, a 2010 album by I Am Kloot
The Sky at Night, a BBC television programme on astronomy
BBC Sky at Night, a BBC magazine associated with The Sky at Night

See also

 
 night sky (disambiguation)
 Night (disambiguation)
 Sky (disambiguation)